Wilfred Elizur Griggs (1866–1918) was an American architect from Waterbury, Connecticut.

Griggs was born in Waterbury on May 2, 1866, to Henry C. and Mary Bassett (Foote) Griggs.  He attended the Waterbury English and Classical School until about 1882, when he went to work for the Waterbury Clock Company.  In 1884 he began attending classes at the Sheffield Scientific School, in New Haven, receiving his degree in 1887.  After, he went to Columbia University in New York, where he studied architecture, graduating in 1889.  For the next few years he worked for New York architects, possibly including Charles D. Marvin, a slightly older architect.

In 1891 he returned to Waterbury, where he opened an office.  A few months later he entered into a partnership with the much older Robert W. Hill, with the stated aim of taking over Hill's office at his retirement.  This occurred in about 1892.  For a brief period circa 1895 he reassociated with Hill, who soon returned to retirement, this time permanently.  Griggs practiced alone until 1900, when he associated with William E. Hunt, as Griggs & Hunt.  Griggs & Hunt grew into Waterbury's leading architectural firm, and lasted until Hunt moved to Torrington in late 1914.  After that, Griggs practiced alone until his death on June 24, 1918.  He was interred at Riverside Cemetery in Waterbury.

Though temporarily managed by Griggs' estate, in early 1919 Fred A. Webster, Griggs' chief draughtsman, took over the business under his own name.

Architectural Works
Wilfred E. Griggs, 1891-1900
 1892 - Y. M. C. A. Building, 136 W Main St, Waterbury, Connecticut
 Demolished
 1894 - Odd Fellows Building, 36 N Main St, Waterbury, Connecticut
 1895 - U. S. Rubber Administration Building, Maple St, Naugatuck, Connecticut
 Demolished in 2014
 1896 - Hopson Block, 180 Church St, Naugatuck, Connecticut
 1896 - Terry Block, 76 Main St, Ansonia, Connecticut
 The upper two floors have been removed
 1897 - Hurlbut National Bank Building, Main St, Winsted, Connecticut
 Demolished
 1898 - Webster School, 90 Platt St, Waterbury, Connecticut
Griggs & Hunt, 1900-1914
 1900 - Thomaston Public Library, 248 Main St, Thomaston, Connecticut
 1901 - David C. Griggs House, 175 Pine St, Waterbury, Connecticut
 1902 - Albert L. Sessions House, 25 Bellevue Ave, Bristol, Connecticut
 1903 - Camp Building, 140 Bank St, Waterbury, Connecticut
 The home of Reid & Hughes
 1903 - Elton Hotel, 30 W. Main St, Waterbury, Connecticut
 In association with Bowditch & Stratton of Boston
 1904 - Frank B. Noble House, 191 Woodruff Ave, Watertown, Connecticut
 1904 - Whittemore Building, 213-219 Bank St, Waterbury, Connecticut
 1905 - Bristol Co. Office Building, 40 Bristol St, Platts Mills, Connecticut
 1905 - Waterbury Boys' Club, Cottage Pl, Waterbury, Connecticut
 Demolished
 1906 - Thomas Neary Memorial Building, 203 Church St, Naugatuck, Connecticut
 1907 - Baldwin School (Former), 68 North St, Watertown, Connecticut
 1908 - Marjorie Hayden House, 70 Pine St, Waterbury, Connecticut
 1909 - New Haven County Courthouse (Remodeling), 7 Kendrick Ave, Waterbury, Connecticut
 1909 - Universalist Chapel, 12 Hewlett St, Waterbury, Connecticut
 1910 - Hampson Building, 99 W Main St, Waterbury, Connecticut
 Demolished
 1910 - Hitchcock and Northrop Apartments, 164-182 W Main St, Waterbury, Connecticut
 1910 - Torrington Electric Light Building, 69 Water St, Torrington, Connecticut
 1911 - Lilley Building, 81 W Main St, Waterbury, Connecticut
 1912 - Masonic Temple, 160 W Main St, Waterbury, Connecticut
 1912 - Standard Building, 14-20 N Main St, Waterbury, Connecticut
 Demolished
 1913 - First Congregational Church Parish House (Remodeling), 40 Deforest St, Watertown, Connecticut
 1914 - Pilling Brass Factory, 480 Watertown Ave, Waterbury, Connecticut
 Griggs would continue to build additions here until his death
Wilfred E. Griggs, 1914-1918
 1916 - Paul D. Hamilton House, 98 Woodlawn Ter, Waterbury, Connecticut
 1916 - Lincoln (Kingsbury) School, 220 Columbia Blvd, Waterbury, Connecticut
 1917 - Steele Building, 41 W Main St, Waterbury, Connecticut
 Demolished
 1918 - Lewis L. Loomer House, 60 Coniston Ave, Waterbury, Connecticut
 1918 - Joseph Telford House, 538 Main St, Waterbury, Connecticut

References

1866 births
1918 deaths
Architects from Waterbury, Connecticut
19th-century American architects
20th-century American architects
Burials at Riverside Cemetery (Waterbury, Connecticut)